"Mr. Bean Goes to Town" is the fourth episode of the British television series Mr. Bean, produced by Tiger Television for Thames Television. It was first broadcast on ITV on 15 October 1991 and was watched by 14.42 million viewers during its original transmission.

This was the first episode to be produced and broadcast in NICAM Stereo and the first to be overseen by a new production team – directors John Birkin and Paul Weiland (working on studio and location sequences respectively) and producer Sue Vertue. It was also the first episode to introduce the familiar 'street' version of the title sequence.

Plot

Act 1: The Television 
Mr. Bean has just bought a portable television and brings it upstairs to his bedroom. Upon unpacking the television and setting it up on a stand, Bean plugs it into a socket and wonders why it is not coming on, only to realize he forgot to connect the plug to the TV's power cable. Upon doing so by screwing the cable into the plug, plugging in the aerial and turning on the TV, he discovers he gets no reception regardless of where he moves the aerial to. When he puts the aerial on the floor and sits on a chair in a particular spot, the TV suddenly gets reception, but only if the TV is not facing him. He tries bending over to see the screen, but loses reception when he turns his head to face the screen. No matter what he does, he cannot get reception with the screen in his line of sight. Ingeniously, he decides to take off all his clothes and assemble them on the chair to resemble himself, and this eventually works when he includes his underwear in the assembly (using the TV's cardboard box to cover himself). Unfortunately, just as Bean sits down to watch the TV, the electricity meter runs out and cuts off the power, much to his annoyance.

Act 2: The Camera Thief 
Later that day, Bean heads out to the Battersea Park to try out his new Polaroid camera with the Three Standing Figures. Unable to get a clear shot, Bean asks a passerby to take his photo, but the man tricks Bean and makes off with the camera. Upon realizing what happened, Bean seeks the thief out, eventually trapping him in a rubbish bin and poking him with a pencil, but the thief gets away just as Bean alerts a passing police officer (Matilda Ziegler) to the incident. At the police station, Bean tries to identify the thief in a police lineup, but asks the police sergeant to make a slight alteration after having difficulty trying to identify the thief by requesting the men in the line-up to have rubbish bins over their heads. Using his pencil, Bean jabs each one until he hears the culprit's scream of pain that he recalls, effectively identifying him to the police.

Act 3: The Shoe & The Evening Date
While heading through town, Bean feels an itch in his foot. To relieve the itch, he removes his shoe and sock and places them on the roof of a parked Mazda 323, only for the car to drive off with them. Bean finds himself forced to hop through town trying to find them, briefly stopping in a shop to find a shoe that matches his own but being unable to buy just one shoe when the salesman insists he buys a pair. Chasing after the car, Bean eventually manages to jump in front of it, causing his shoe and sock to fall off and into his grasp, and leaving him to thank the driver.

Walking through town at night, Bean attempts to comb his hair in a shop window, but has difficulty combing the back of his head. To resolve the problem, he uses an ID photo booth to photograph the back of his head, before heading off to a nightclub called "Club Phut" (the word was previously seen as graffiti at the start of "The Return of Mr. Bean"), meeting up with his girlfriend Irma Gobb (also played by Ziegler). Inside, the pair enter the stage area where a magic act is being performed by a magician named Eddie Spangle. Trying to attract the attention of a waitress, Bean inadvertently becomes a volunteer in the magic show. He soon causes mayhem when the magician uses his watch for a magic trick, and messes up some of the magician's magical gimmicks while searching for his watch, much to Irma's disgrace. Upon retrieving it but seeing his girlfriend gone, Bean heads out and into the club's dance floor while Spangle angrily searches for him after he ruined his show.

Inside the disco, Bean finds Irma dancing with another unnamed man. Jealous and trembled, Bean tries to butt in and take back Irma, who ignores him again and simply continues dancing with the other man, eventually leading him to force the man out of the disco. Hoping to get Irma to dance with him, Bean asks the DJ to change the music to something romantic, only to find that the man returned and is embracing Irma. Heartbroken and humiliated, Bean exits the disco, but unwilling to be beaten, he spots the club's power breaker and shuts it off on his way out. In the ending scene, Bean passes by a shop with televisions in its display window on his way home, which go to static when he passes them and return to normal, even when he sticks his hand in front of them after the ending credits.

Cast 
 Rowan Atkinson as Mr. Bean
 Matilda Ziegler as Irma Gobb and the policewoman
 Nick Hancock as the camera thief
 Robin Driscoll as the police sergeant
 Dursley McLinden as the Shoe Salesman 
 Alan Shaxon as Eddie Spangle
 Julia Howson as Monique
 Richard Marcangelo and Howard Goodall as musicians
 Mark Khan and Phil Nice as disco dancers

Production 
The day after the original transmission of this episode, Thames Television – which originally commissioned and broadcast the series on behalf of the ITV network – learned it would lose its broadcast franchise at the end of the following year. As an independent production company, Thames continued its involvement with the series following 1992 but the network commission and compliance responsibility was handed over to Central Independent Television, who also oversaw a number of Thames' independent productions for the ITV network.

The location sequences in this episode were filmed at Battersea Park and Kingston upon Thames. Exterior scenes outside Mr. Bean's flat were filmed in Surbiton for several episodes in the series. The location scenes also switched from using OB videotape to 35 mm film. Studio sequences were recorded before a live audience at Thames Television's Teddington Studios.

References

External links 
 

Mr. Bean episodes
1991 British television episodes
Television shows written by Rowan Atkinson
Television shows written by Richard Curtis
Television shows written by Robin Driscoll